The National Dirt Late Model Hall of Fame is a non-profit hall of fame for American drivers of dirt late model racecars. It is located on the grounds of Florence Speedway in Walton, Kentucky.

History
During 2001 while conversing with a group of people involved in the sport, longtime motorsports journalist Bill Holder decided to create the National Dirt Late Model Hall of Fame. The first induction ceremony took place later in August at Florence Speedway during their annual NORTH-SOUTH 100.

Induction process
Within the NDLMHOF, there are three types of inductees, each of which contributes to the sport in a different manner. The types are Drivers, Contributors, and the Sportsman Award.

All of the inductees are elected by the vote of a Hall of Fame Voting Board on candidates that have been submitted. The voting board consists of voters from all aspects of the Dirt Late Model scene.

The general requirements for the drivers are that they must have at least 30 years in the sport or are retired. Although it was initially required for all drivers to be retired, that no longer is a constraint because experience has shown that many of them never retire. Normally, six (unless a tie) are taken from this category.

The Contributor category includes individuals from all aspects of the sport including promoters, series directors, car builders, engine builders, crew chiefs, car owners, media types, etc. This category provides two inductees.

Finally, there is the Sportsman Award category which inducts one active driver. This inductee, who is also voted on by the Voting Board is an individual who supports the Dirt Late Model sport by working closely with promoters, track owners, sanctioning body heads, helps young and inexperienced drivers, and maybe most importantly, interfaces with the fans. This category is done completely by the Voting Board who both nominates the candidates and then selects the winner.

List of inductees

2001–2005 

2001
Drivers:
 Jack Boggs
 Rodney Combs
 Jim Dunn
 Mike Duvall
 Larry Moore
 Larry Phillips
 Jeff Purvis
 Buck Simmons
 Freddy Smith
 Charlie Swartz

Contributors to the sport:7
 Earl Baltes
 Ed Howe
 Jimmy Mosteller
 C.J. Rayburn
 Robert Smawley

2002
 B.J. Parker
 Bob Memmer
 Ray Callahan
 Barry Wright
 Bob Wearing, Sr.
 Jerry Inmon
 Pat Patrick
 B. J. Parker
 Tom Helfrich
 Red Farmer
 Donnie Moran
 Scott Bloomquist
 Billy Moyer
 Donnie Moran

2003
 Leon Archer
 Delmas Conley
 Jim Curry
 Ray Godsey
 Bud Lunsford
 John Mason
 Russ Petro
 Bob Pierce
 Rick Gross
 J.W. Hunt
 Johnny Johnson
 Carl Short

2004
 Bob Miller
 Bob Newton
 Butch Hartman
 Rodney Franklin
 Chub Frank
 Ed Dixon
 Ed Sanger
 Floyd Gilbert
 Larry Shaw
 Ronnie Johnson

2005
 Charlie Hughes
 Doug Kenimer
 Billy Teegarden
 Tom Nesbitt
 Lynn Geisler
 Rick Aukland
 Frank Plessinger
 Brad Malcuit
 Bill Holder

2006–2010

2006
 Ken Essary
 Chris Francis
 Ralph Latham
 Vern Lefevers
 Doc Lehman
 Pete Parker
 Jack Pennington
 Dick Potts

2007
 Verlin Eakers
 Ralph Earnhardt
 Gene Petro
 Herb Scott
 David Speer
 HE Vineyard
 Mike Swims
 Mickey Swims

2008
 Danny Dean
 Herman Goddard
 Joe Kosiski
 Chuck McWilliams
 Gary Stuhler
 Gary Webb
 Butterball Wooldridge
 Morgan Chandler
 Porter Lanigan

2009
 Gene Chupp
 Stick Elliott
 Tootle Estes
 Bruce Gould
 Don Hester
 Kris Patterson
 Carlton Lamm
 Mark Richards
 Ken Schrader (Sportsman Award)

2010
 Ernie Derr
 Ronnie Weedon
 Steve Kosiski
 Roger Long
 Mike Head
 Billy Scott
 Bobby Paul
 Thomas Family from Alabama

2011–2015

2011
 Don Bohlander
 William "Fats" Coffey
 Kevin Gundaker
 Bill Morgan
 Rance Phillips
 Ramo Stott
 Roscoe Smith (Contributing Award)
 Family of Joe Lee (Contributing Award)
 Family of Jean Johnson (Contributing Award)
 Dale McDowell (Sportsman Award)
 Bub McCool (Hall of Fame Spirit Award)
 Jeep Van Warmer (Hall of Fame Spirit Award)

2012

 Mike Balzano
 Kenny Brightbill
 Ray Guss Jr.
 Don Hobbs
 Doug Ingalls
 Keith and Tader Masters from Mastersbilt Chassis (Contributors)
 Raye Vest (Contributor)
 Jimmy Owens (Sportsman)

2013
 Eddie Carrier, Sr.
 Darrell Dake
 Bill Frye
 John Gill
 Willy Kraft
 Bret Emrick (Contributor-Race Director and Announcer)
 Joe Garrison (Contributor-GRT Chassis builder)
 Jack Starrette (Contributor-Sponsor)
 Don O'Neal (Sportsman Award)
 Wally Heminger (Lifetime Achievement Award)

2014

 Denny Bonebrake
 Steve Francis
 Ed Gibbons
 Bob Kosiski
 Ken Walton
 Allan E. Brown (Contributor-Journalist)
 Walter Burson (Contributor-Technical Inspector)
 Larry and Penny Eckrich (Contributor-Car Owners)
 Red Farmer (Sportsman Award)
 Luke Hoffner (Lifetime Achievement)
 Fred King (Lifetime Achievement)

2015
 Skip Arp
 LaVern "Red" Droste
 Curt Hansen
 Davey Johnson
 Leon Sells
 Jim Butler(Contributor-Photographer)
 Al Frieden (Contributor-Track Promoter)
 Wayne Kindness (Contributor-Writer/Editor)
 Butch Shay (Lifetime Achievement)
 Craig Cowan (Lifetime Achievement)
 Eddie Carrier Jr. (Sportsman Award)

2016–present
2016
Tom Hearst
Tiny Lund
Tony Izzo Sr.
Leon Plank
Fulmer Lance
Steve Norris (Crew Chief)(Contributor)
Ed Petroff (Sponsor)(Contributor)
Lee Roy Rumley (Engine Builder)(Contributor)
Eldon Butcher (Lifetime Achievement)
Ron Jerger Sr. (Lifetime Achievement)
Forrest Lucas (Earl Baltes Award)

2017

Roger Dolan
Rick Eckert
Joe Merryfield
Dale McDowell
Kenny Simpson
David & John Draime (Engine Builders)(Contributor)
Joel Hedrick (Car Builder/Team Manager)(Contributor)
Jim Wilson (Car Owner/Promoter)(Contributor)
Gerald Dixon (Lifetime Achievement)
Ray Traube (Lifetime Achievement)

2018

Steve Barnett
Don Hoffman
Jimmy Mars
Steve Shaver
Wendell Wallace
Dottie & Lee Byers (Car Owners) (Contributor)
the Cook Family (Track Owners/Promoters)(Contributor)
Tony Hammett (Photographer)(Contributor)
Mike Farr (Lifetime Achievement)
Bubby James (Lifetime Achievement)

2019
Wayne Brooks
Stan Massey
Billy Thomas
Lil’ John Provenzano
Kevin Weave
Cornett Racing Engines
Mooney Starr
Keith Knaack
Reference:

Footnotes

External links

 

Dirt track racing in the United States
Auto racing museums and halls of fame
Dirt
Sports museums in Kentucky
Museums in Boone County, Kentucky
2001 establishments in Kentucky
Museums established in 2001